Family Guy is an American TV series created by Seth MacFarlane for the Fox Broadcasting Company. The main characters of the show are Peter Griffin, his wife Lois, their elder daughter Meg, son Chris, their dog Brian and the most recent child Stewie. The popularity of the series prompted several video game developers to create video games based on the series, including a pinball machine that was created in 2007 by Stern.

Video games based on the series have been on multiple platforms since the first game's debut in 2006. The first video game, Family Guy Video Game! was developed by High Voltage Software and published by 2K Games for the PlayStation 2, Xbox and PlayStation Portable. Since then, another video game has been made for PlayStation 3, Xbox 360 and Microsoft Windows called Family Guy: Back to the Multiverse developed by Heavy Iron Studios and published by Activision.

Video games
As of 2017, 8 video games based on Family Guy have been published.

See also
List of video game franchises

Video games
 
Family Guy